Clair L. Finch (July 31, 1911 – December 1, 1976) was an American lawyer and politician.  He was a member of the Wisconsin State Assembly for four terms.

Biography
Born in Palisade, Colorado, Finch graduated from Antigo High School in Antigo, Wisconsin. He received his bachelor's degree from University of Wisconsin and his law degree from University of Wisconsin Law School. Finch practiced law in Antigo, Wisconsin and was a Republican. Finch served in the Wisconsin State Assembly in 1943, 1945, 1947, and 1949. He resigned from the Assembly after the 1949 session.  From 1940 to 1974, Finch served on the Wisconsin Board of Tax Appeals and was chairman of the tax appeal board. Finch died in a hospital in Madison, Wisconsin, and was buried in Antigo, Wisconsin.

Notes

1911 births
1976 deaths
People from Antigo, Wisconsin
People from Mesa County, Colorado
University of Wisconsin–Madison alumni
University of Wisconsin Law School alumni
Wisconsin lawyers
20th-century American politicians
20th-century American lawyers
Republican Party members of the Wisconsin State Assembly